Powell is a city in the U.S. state of Ohio, located 14 miles (21.5 km) north of the state capital of Columbus. The city is located in Delaware County; a frequent placeholder on the List of highest-income counties in the United States, and 35th wealthiest county in the United States in 2020. Powell had an estimated population of 13,375 in 2019, up from 11,500 at the 2010 census. Founded in the early 1800s, it is now a growing suburb of Columbus. Per the U.S. Census Bureau, 73.5% of Powell residents over the age of 25 are college graduates, the median home value is $372,700, and the median household income is $157,149. In 2018, the median list price of a home within the City of Powell was $411,173.

History

Early history

Present-day Powell is located on land that was once a vast wilderness sparsely populated by Native Americans including the Huron, Wyandot, Miami, Delaware, Ottawa, Shawnee, Mingo, and Erie people. The region was surveyed by French Canadian and European explorers beginning in the 17th century; with Great Britain, France, and the Iroquois League claiming ownership of the land during periods of the 1600s and 1700s. By the 18th century, the land became part of that what is historically known as Ohio Country. During the American Revolution, the states of Connecticut, New York, Pennsylvania, and Virginia claimed portions of the land during western expansion of the United States. The Land Ordinance of 1785 opened up the region to settlement by American pioneers, including veterans of the American Revolutionary War who had received bounty land warrants as compensation for their services. In 1787, the region was established as the Northwest Territory.

Settlement and growth

The first settlers arrived in present-day Powell on May 1, 1801. At the time, the land was deeded to Thomas R. Hall. By 1813, records indicate that the settlement became known as "Middlebury", in possible reference to early settlers having come from Middlebury, Connecticut. Today, Powell maintains references to its heritage as Middlebury with multiple streets and housing developments applying the name.

The population of Middlebury remained small, with historical records suggesting that settlers held trades and occupations consistent with other small towns of time period. The settlement included farmers, milliners, buggy makers, and blacksmiths. In 1839, deed owner Thomas R. Hall purchased additional nearby land, and later opened a general store. Middlebury was renamed for him in 1850, becoming "Hall's Corner". According to historical records, a variant of this new name has been recorded as "Hall Corners". In 1857, Hall's Corner applied for an official post office, which required the approval of a judge. The village was renamed Powell in honor of the judge who approved the request.

The Columbus and Toledo Railroad (C&T) arrived in Powell in 1872, which provided new opportunities for settlers. The primary purpose of the railroad was to transport coal from Appalachia to regions beyond Columbus. After merging with two other railroads in 1899, C&T became part of the Hocking Valley Railway. As of 2021, much of the line still operates as the Columbus Subdivision freight line, owned by CSX Transportation.

Powell was finally incorporated as a municipality in 1947, and was later known as the Village of Powell.  The population remained small until the late 1980s, when residential development expanding from the northern Columbus metropolitan area reached Powell.  In 20 years, the population grew almost 1,500%, from 378 to over 6,000. In 2000, Powell officially became a city.

Between the years 2000 and 2010, Powell's population nearly doubled again, largely due to the 2002 annexation of approximately 1,000 acres along the Sawmill Parkway extension north of Seldom Seen Road for the development of the Golf Village community.

Liberty Township Separation Movement of 1995

On February 21, 1995, Powell Village Council members voted 5-1 in favor of an ordinance requesting Delaware County Commissioners withdraw the Village of Powell from Liberty Township, with Councilman Bill Nolan dissenting. The decision was made without soliciting a community vote, which prompted residents to mount a referendum drive in hope of placing the separation issue on the November ballot. The separation of Powell from Liberty Township would have left the Village without fire department services, and would have impacted master planning efforts of the community. Proponents of the separation insisted that Liberty Township was too dependent on inside millage; the approximately $95,000 yearly that Powell residents were paying into Liberty Township's general fund.

Powell Village residents needed 74 signatures to place the issue on the November ballot. A group of residents from The Chase and The Retreat subdivisions collected 179 signatures and submitted them to village clerk Doris Moore, on March 8, 1995. However, the Village Council refused the petition, citing a technicality with Ohio Revised Code section 731.32. Dan Boyle, organizer of the referendum movement and then president of The Chase Homeowner's Association, insisted that the petition had been properly executed according to local charter section 6.10, entitled "Initiative and Referendum Petition Procedures."

Following the Council's decision to refuse the petition, Powell resident and attorney Lawrence Walker urged Delaware County Commissioner W. Duncan Whitney and Powell Mayor Jane VanFossen to take action. Mayor VanFossen ultimately decided that the Clerk of Council failed to perform her obligation of processing the petition, an action that therefore voided the separation legislation of the Council; Ordinance No. 93-54. Due to significant public interest generated in the wake of the petition, Powell's Village Council agreed to place the issue on the ballot of the August 8 special election. Of the 384 residents in Powell that voted on the separation, 98 (26%) voted for the separation, and 286 (74%) voted against the separation. Powell was subsequently not removed from the Township, and an amicable relationship between the City of Powell and Liberty Township has continued ever since.

Powell Liberty Historical Society

The Powell Liberty Historical Society (PLHS) was formed in 1986 during a successful effort to save an 1889 farm house amid a rapid influx of housing developments. Local residents Louise Cornish and Janet Masteller led the campaign to save and restore the 1889 home; considered to be an example of midwestern architecture of the late 19th century. The house is called the Martin-Perry House, in honor of the only two families to have lived in the home. PLHS is located on Powell Road at Grace Drive, and has been open for tours since 1990. The society is a non-profit, volunteer organization that preserves the history of Powell and Liberty Township.

Geography

The city sits between the Scioto and Olentangy Rivers, about 14 miles (21.5 km) north of the state capital of Columbus, centered on the intersection of State Route 750 and C.R.9; known as Liberty Street within the City of Powell. This intersection is commonly referred to by residents as the Four Corners. It sits within Liberty Township, the site of the first settlement in Delaware County, Ohio.

Neighborhoods

City of Powell

There are many residential subdivisions in Powell. In 1974, the first home was built in The Retreat, marking the development of Powell's first subdivision. The Retreat was designed to include all custom-built homes on wooded lots of at least one acre; arguably the largest lots in Powell. It wasn't until the 1980s that growth from the Columbus Metropolitan Area reached Powell, spurring the development of additional subdivisions. In addition to The Retreat, most of the original subdivisions developed in the late 1980s are found just west of the Olentangy River, off Powell Road. These include The Chase, Cardinal Hill, Deer Run, Bartholomew Run, Falcon Ridge, and Olentangy Ridge. Throughout the 1990s, development continued on Ashmoore, The Lakes of Powell, Powell Place, Grandshire, Liberty Ridge, Liberty Hills, and the Woods of Sawmill. Beginning in 1998, development shifted to Big Bear Farms, Chamber's Glen, Golf Village, and Middlebury Estates.

In April 2001, following the sale of 100 acres of land between Sawmill Parkway and South Liberty Street, development began on Murphy's Crossing and Murphy's Park in south-central Powell. The acreage had previously been home to the Powell Speedway racetrack and Murphy's Party Barn. From 2002 to 2015, residential development shifted predominantly toward northwest Powell, including Golf Village, Rutherford Estates, Woods of Powell North, and Woods of Powell South, among others.

In 2016, the Building Industry Association of Central Ohio (BIA) hosted its annual Parade of Homes in the newly built Verona subdivision, off West Powell Road. The community was developed by Romanelli & Hughes on the site of the former Shamrock Golf Course, and features 112 single-family homes and 54 Patio Homes. Previously, the BIA Parade of Homes had been hosted in Powell in 1985 and 1987, both times in the Olentangy Ridge subdivision.

Powell Mailing Address

Not all addresses within the Powell 43065 zip code are located within the municipal boundary of Powell. Due to Powell's suburban location, there are numerous subdivisions found just outside the physical boundaries of The City of Powell that share Powell mailing addresses. These subdivisions are found in the Powell Postal City Area, even though they are geographically located in portions of Liberty Township. In this case, the residents of these outlying subdivisions may still consider themselves to be Powell residents due to their USPS mailing addresses instead of their geographic location; a phenomenon acknowledged by The Census Bureau.

Loch Lomond, off Olentangy River Road, began development in the late 1980s, followed by the subdivisions of Sherborne Mews and Daventry Park in the early 1990s.

Just to the west of The City of Powell, The Wedgewood Golf & Country Club opened in 1991, boasting more than 440 single family homes. The private facility features a 49,500 square foot clubhouse, fitness center, swimming complex, and dining room, as well as an 18-hole golf course designed by Robert Trent Jones, II. In 1993, Wedgewood hosted the BIA Parade of Homes. In 2016, Wedgewood hosted the US Open Sectional Qualifier.

In 2001, residential development expanded east of the Olentangy River to include the subdivisions of Riverbend and Deep Run. By 2017, development had largely been completed at River Run Estates, a private, gated community off Jewett Road. By 2021, work had largely been completed on Loch Lomond Hills, a luxury condominium community developed by Cugini & Capoccia Builders, one of the first of its kind for the Powell area.

Notably, the two ultra-luxury subdivisions of Woodland Hall and Wingate Farms were built across the postal limits of Powell and Delaware, Ohio. Roughly half of the single-family homes in these neighborhoods have postal addresses in Powell, while the remainder have Delaware County addresses.

Demographics

2010 census
As of the census of 2010, there were 11,500 people, 3,796 households, and 3,227 families residing in the city. The racial makeup of the city was 88.5% White, 1.9% African American, 0.1% Native American, 7.5% Asian, 0.3% from other races, and 1.7% from two or more races. Hispanic or Latino of any race were 1.4% of the population.

There were 3,796 households, of which 53.5% had children under the age of 18 living with them, 77.8% were married couples living together, 5.4% had a female householder with no husband present, 1.8% had a male householder with no wife present, and 15.0% were non-families. 12.6% of all households were made up of individuals, and 4.5% had someone living alone who was 65 years of age or older. The average household size was 3.03 and the average family size was 3.33.

The median age in the city was 37.4 years. 34.7% of residents were under the age of 18; 3.4% were between the ages of 18 and 24; 28.1% were from 25 to 44; 26.2% were from 45 to 64; and 7.7% were 65 years of age or older. The gender makeup of the city was 49.2% male and 50.8% female.

2000 census
As of the census of 2000, there were 6,247 people, 1,975 households, and 1,789 families residing in the city.  The population density was 2,057.3 people per square mile (793.4/km2).  There were 2,032 housing units at an average density of 669.2 per square mile (258.1/km2).  The racial makeup of the city was 94.29% White, 1.55% African American, 0.10% Native American, 0.92% Asian, 0.22% from other races, and 0.85% from two or more races. Hispanic or Latino of any race were 1.09% of the population.

There were 1,975 households, out of which 56.7% had children under the age of 18 living with them, 86.1% were married couples living together, 3.3% had a female householder with no husband present, and 9.4% were non-families. 7.2% of all households were made up of individuals, and 1.3% had someone living alone who was 65 years of age or older.  The average household size was 3.16 and the average family size was 3.34.

In the city, the population was spread out, with 35.9% under the age of 18, 2.7% from 18 to 24, 36.4% from 25 to 44, 21.1% from 45 to 64, and 3.8% who were 65 years of age or older.  The median age was 35 years. For every 100 females, there were 100.9 males.  For every 100 females age 18 and over, there were 97.7 males.

The median income for a household in the city was $115,904, and the median income for a family was $117,801. Males had a median income of $79,146 versus $42,656 for females. The per capita income for the city was $46,257.  About 0.4% of families and 0.4% of the population were below the poverty line, including 0.7% of those under age 18 and none of those age 65 or over.

Economy

Powell is a bedroom community north of Columbus. Powell contains various trade areas and commercial zones that offer job opportunities for locals, but more than 90% of taxpayers commute to other municipalities for their employment.

On February 5, 2019, the Powell City Council approved multiple ordinances to allow Ohio State University's Wexner Medical Center to develop an Outpatient Surgery Center near the intersection of Sawmill Parkway and Home Road. The land for the project was annexed into Powell by a 6-1 council vote, with Councilman Brendan Newcomb dissenting. The development is expected to have a significant economic impact on Powell, and is forecast to bring hundreds of high paying jobs to the city in multiple phases.

COVID-19 Pandemic

Powell is subject to jurisdiction by The Ohio Department of Health. Due to spreading cases of COVID-19, a State of Emergency was declared in Ohio on March 9, 2020. On March 15, Ohio Governor Mike DeWine enacted numerous statewide responses to the COVID-19 pandemic, including curfews and capacity restrictions. The first case of COVID-19 to be diagnosed in Delaware County occurred on March 18, 2020.

Powell's local government committee meetings were suspended on March 10, 2020; later to be held via Zoom video conferencing. Powell's city buildings, parks, sport facilities, playgrounds, and community gardens remained closed until June. The annual Powell Festival was cancelled, and all Powell Parks & Recreation classes were suspended. Due to safety and financial implications, the OSA Board of Trustees decided to keep the Powell Pool closed for the entire 2020 swim season. The Olentangy Local School District suspended in-person classes beginning on March 16, 2020.

On October 15, 2019, Powell City Council unanimously approved the creation of Designated Outdoor Refreshment Areas (DORA) for use in 2020. The legislation allowed customers to purchase alcoholic beverages in marked cups from bars and restaurants for outdoor consumption on designated streets and sidewalks. Powell's DORA are an important way for residents to support local businesses.

Government

Powell's local government is made up of city officials and staff, police and fire departments, and a variety of governmental agencies. The Powell City Council appoints specialized boards to address action items within the community. Some of these boards include the Powell Community Improvement Corporation, the Planning and Zoning Commission, the Historic Downtown Advisory Commission, and the Board of Zoning Appeals.

Parks and Recreation

Powell Pool
Powell is home to a nonprofit, private swim club located at Adventure Park (previously North Park), commonly referred to as the Powell Pool. The Powell Pool was constructed in 1995 after Powell residents Shawn Flahive, Brad Reynolds, Paul Pratt, and Bob Schaumleffel approached the Village Council about the lack of a community pool. The 9,500 square-foot pool was financed through initial membership fees, which ran at $1,000 per household, with the separate diving well added later. Original amenities at the Powell Pool included a 165 foot water slide, zero entry area with concrete umbrella fountain, toddler wading pool, and an eight lane lap pool.  Prior to the construction of the Powell Pool, many residents utilized the historic Mt. Air Swimming Pool in Worthington, which was operational from 1928 until 1997. The Wyandot Lake water park was also located nearby; (now called Zoombezi Bay). Today, the Powell Pool is a community landmark.

The Powell Pool is the home of The Olentangy Swim Association (OSA) and the youth 'Tangy Tornadoes Swim Team. The team offers friendly competition with nearby country clubs and swim leagues, including the  Muirfield Muirfins and the Upper Arlington Swim & Racket Club. Competition is offered for various age groups during the summer, from age 7 to 18.

In July 2022, The OSA Board of Trustees announced a "Save the Pool" campaign in effort to raise more than $250,000 for essential updates and repairs. Chronic leaks and cracked concrete have led to the need to replace the pool's entire concrete bottom. The Powell Pool is tied to a lease that puts all financial responsibility on its members, and receives no financial support from the City of Powell for pool operations. The project will take place in the fall of 2023, and will not impact the pool's summer season. Other updates have already taken place, including the renovation of the pool's restroom facilities, replacement of the pools pumps and motors, the removal of the pool's original concrete mushroom, and the purchasing of new chairs and umbrellas.

Parks

The City of Powell offers nine public parks, including Village Green Park, which is the location of the annual Powell Festival. Other parks include Adventure Park, Arbor Ridge Park, Library Park, Oak Park, Beechwood Park, Meadowview Park, Murphy Park, and Seldom Seen Park. The parks offer a wide range of sports facilities for basketball, volleyball, skating, tennis, pickle ball, and soccer. Additionally, Village Green Park offers a splash pad, concert amphitheater, playground, and pavilion shelters. Bike paths and multiuse trails connect many parks with the nearby subdivisions.

Education

Powell is officially a city and is thus authorized by the laws of the State of Ohio to form a city school district.  However, it instead continues to associate with the Olentangy Local School District. Powell is home to one of Olentangy Local School District's high schools, Olentangy Liberty High School, as well as Tyler Run Elementary. Olentangy Local School District received the highest rating of "excellent with distinction" on its 2020 report card from the Ohio Department of Education. Powell is also home to a kindergarten to grade 12 private college-preparatory school called Village Academy (closed summer 2019 due to a decline in enrollment).

Powell has a public library, a branch of the Delaware County District Library. The Powell Library is located in Library Park, just south of downtown Powell. The 5,000-square-foot branch offers thousands of books and free programming for children and Delaware County Residents.

Public safety
Law enforcement - Powell Police Department
Fire and emergency medical service - Liberty Township Fire Department

Although Powell maintains its own police department, it is served by the Liberty Township Fire Department (LTFD), which has two stations less than a mile from the northern and western borders of the city. LTFD has been serving Powell since 1947, and both stations are maintained by a 24/7 staff of firefighters. Station 321 has a ladder, medic, and engine and other apparatus and is located on Liberty Road; Station 322 has an engine medic and air unit, they are located off of Sawmill Parkway, and they have a distinct slogan "First Due at the Zoo", because the Columbus Zoo is located almost a mile away.

Notable people
This list includes notable people who were born or had lived in Powell, Ohio.
 A. J. Arcuri, NFL football player (Los Angeles Rams)
 Tala Ashe, Actress (Legends of Tomorrow)
 Jon Busch, MLS Soccer Player (Chicago Fire S.C.)
 D. Michael Crites, United States Attorney for the Southern District of Ohio in the administrations of presidents Ronald Reagan and George H.W. Bush
 Emily Douglas, founder of Grandma's Gifts
 Melina Kanakaredes, actress (CSI: NY)
 Gary Levox, Rascal Flatts singer
 Thad Matta, former OSU basketball coach
 Chinedum Ndukwe, former NFL football player (Cincinnati Bengals and Oakland Raiders)
 Chris Perry, Former PGA golfer
 Michael Redd, former NBA basketball player (Milwaukee Bucks and Phoenix Suns)
 Robert Smith, former NFL football player (Minnesota Vikings)
 Valerie Still, former ABL and WNBA basketball player (Columbus Quest and Washington Mystics)
 R. J. Umberger, NHL hockey player (Philadelphia Flyers, Columbus Blue Jackets)
 Mike Vrabel, former NFL football player (Pittsburgh Steelers, New England Patriots, and Kansas City Chiefs)
 William White, former NFL football player (Detroit Lions, Kansas City Chiefs, and Atlanta Falcons)
 Greg Oden, former NBA basketball player (Portland Trail Blazers, Miami Heat)
 Lou Rosselli, wrestling coach (University of Oklahoma)

References

External links
 City website
 Map of Powell subdivisions
 Delaware County GIS
 Liberty Township Fire Department
  Historic Downtown Powell, Inc. Local downtown business development group.

Cities in Ohio
Cities in Delaware County, Ohio
Populated places established in 1801
1801 establishments in the Northwest Territory